The Dutch Eerste Divisie in the 1968–69 season was contested by 18 teams, one less than in the previous season. This was because no teams relegated from the 1967–68 Eredivisie. Schiedamse Voetbal Vereniging (SVV) won the championship.

New entrants
Promoted from the 1967–68 Tweede Divisie:
 Helmond Sport
 Veendam
 FC Wageningen

League standings

Relegation play-off
Volewijckers and FC Eindhoven played a relegation play-off at a neutral venue (Vitesse)

FC Eindhoven were relegated to the Tweede Divisie.

See also
 1968–69 Eredivisie
 1968–69 Tweede Divisie

References
Netherlands - List of final tables (RSSSF)

Eerste Divisie seasons
2
Neth